To Prevent The Earth From Moving With You is the second and final studio album by Malaysian rock band, Disagree. The album was released on June 30, 2009. It is a follow-up to their first album, At the End of the Day.

Track listing

Personnel
Zahid (Vocals/Lead Guitar)
Hamka (Drums)
Aziz (Bass)
David (Rhythm Guitar)

Awards
17th Anugerah Industri Muzik
Best Album Cover
Best Local English Album

References
Article on the album 'To Prevent The Earth From Moving With You'..

2009 albums
Disagree (band) albums